Ancylosis mimeugraphella is a species of snout moth in the genus Ancylosis. It was described by Boris Balinsky in 1989 and is found in South Africa and Namibia.

References

Moths described in 1989
mimeugraphella
Insects of Namibia
Moths of Africa